Manchester is the name of places in the U.S. state of Wisconsin:

Manchester, Green Lake County, Wisconsin
Manchester (community), Green Lake County, Wisconsin
Manchester, Jackson County, Wisconsin
Manchester, former name for Brothertown, Wisconsin in Calumet County from 1843 until 1857